The 2007–08 Washington Capitals season began on October 5, 2007. It was the Capitals' 34th season in the National Hockey League.

On November 22, Head Coach Glen Hanlon was fired after starting the Capitals with a 6–14–1 record, the team's worst start since the 1981–82 season. He was replaced by Bruce Boudreau on an interim basis until December 26, when Boudreau's position was made permanent.

On March 21, Alexander Ovechkin scored his 60th goal of the season in a game against the Atlanta Thrashers, becoming the first NHL player to accomplish the feat in 12 years, and tying Dennis Maruk's single-season franchise record. He would go on to break the record in the Capitals' next game, a 3–2 shootout win over the Carolina Hurricanes, on March 25. On April 3, Ovechkin scored twice to break Luc Robitaille's single-season left-winger goal-scoring record of 63 goals. Ovechkin finished the regular season with 65 goals and 112 points and won the Hart Memorial Trophy, awarded to the NHL's Most Valuable Player. He remains the only NHL player to exceed 60 goals in a season in the salary cap era.

On April 5, the Capitals defeated the Florida Panthers 3–1 at home to clinch the franchise's third Southeast Division title and fourth Division title overall. The Capitals became the first team in NHL history to make the playoffs after being ranked 14th or lower in the standings at the season's midpoint.

In the playoffs, the Capitals won their first game against the Philadelphia Flyers, but then lost three consecutive games to fall behind three games to one. They managed to win their next two games to force a Game 7, but lost in overtime on a power play goal by Joffrey Lupul.

Regular season
On March 3, 2008, the Capitals defeated the Boston Bruins at home by a score of 10–2. Alexander Ovechkin scored three goals in the game. It was the first time that the Capitals had scored 10 goals in a regular season game since January 11, 2003, when they defeated the Florida Panthers at home by a score of 12–2.

Season standings

Division standings

Conference standings

Schedule and results

October

Record: 5-6-0; Home: 2-3-0; Road: 3-3-0

November

Record: 3-10-2 ; Home: 1-5-1 ; Road: 2-5-1

December

Record: 7-3-3; Home: 4-2-0; Road: 3-1-3

January

Record: 9-4-0; Home: 7-1-0; Road: 2-3-0

February

Record: 6-4-3; Home: 2-2-2; Road: 4-2-1

March

Record: 10-4-0; Home: 4-2-0; Road: 6-2-0

April

Record: 3-0-0; Home: 3-0-0; Road: 0-0-0

Playoffs

Player statistics

Skaters

Note: GP = Games played; G = Goals; A = Assists; Pts = Points; +/- = Plus/minus; PIM = Penalty minutes

Goaltenders
Note: GP = Games played; TOI = Time on ice (minutes); W = Wins; L = Losses; OT = Overtime losses; GA = Goals against; SO = Shutouts; Sv% = Save percentage; GAA = Goals against average

Awards and records

Records

Milestones

Awards

Transactions
The Capitals have been involved in the following transactions during the 2007–08 season.

Trades

Free agents

Draft picks
Washington's picks at the 2007 NHL Entry Draft in Columbus, Ohio.  The Capitals had the 5th overall pick .

Farm teams

American Hockey League
The Hershey Bears are the Capitals American Hockey League affiliate in 2007–08.

ECHL
The South Carolina Stingrays are the Capitals ECHL affiliate in 2007–08.

See also
 2007–08 NHL season

References

Wash
Wash
Washington Capitals seasons
Cap
Cap